The Honda RA300 was a Formula One racing car produced by Honda Racing, and introduced towards the end of the 1967 Formula One season. It retained the same V12 engine as the preceding RA273 car, but the chassis was designed by Lola's Eric Broadley and based on a previous Lola Indianapolis 500 car, the T90. Internally, Lola designated the RA300 the T130. This collaboration resulted in the machine quickly being dubbed the "Hondola" by the motorsports press.

Broadley's chassis was much lighter and sweeter-handling than the in-house RA273. The car initially performed impressively, winning in its first-ever World Championship race, the Italian Grand Prix at Monza. Driver John Surtees took the lead from Jim Clark's Lotus and Jack Brabham's Brabham on the final lap, after Clark ran out of fuel and Brabham ran wide. However, the RA300 flattered to deceive, and this would turn out to be the only lap that the car would lead. It remains the only F1 car ever to take its single victory in its first Grand Prix, and on the only lap it would ever lead.

Honda continued with the RA300 for the remainder of the 1967 season, Surtees finishing fourth at the final race in Mexico. The car was then raced one last time at the opening race of the 1968 season in South Africa, Surtees finishing eighth, before being superseded by the RA301, a design closely based on the RA300.

The 48-valve V12 engine first appeared in the RA273 at the 1966 Italian Grand Prix, driven by Richie Ginther. In spite of weighing 740 kg (dry), it was capable of spinning the rear tyres at 100 mph in third gear. With cylinder dimensions of 78.0 x 52.2 mm and a displacement of 2,993.17 cc, a target of 400-440 bhp at 12,000 rpm was quoted. The engine used by Surtees at Monza in 1967 was quoted by Motoring News as developing only 396 bhp, but with improved torque and response. Honda quotes the 1967 RA300 as producing "over 420 PS" (414 bhp) at 11,500rpm.  The vehicle weight excess over the 500 kg minimum had been approximately halved, with Honda quoting a weight of 590 kg.

Formula One World Championship results
(key) (results in bold indicate pole position; results in italics indicate fastest lap)

 Includes 8 points scored using the Honda RA273.
 All 14 points scored using the Honda RA301.

References

External links

Honda Formula One cars
Lola Formula One cars